

Gustav-Georg Knabe (8 July 1897 – 13 December 1972) was a general in the Wehrmacht of Nazi Germany during World War II. He was a recipient of the Knight's Cross of the Iron Cross.

Awards

 Knight's Cross of the Iron Cross on 1 June 1941 as Oberstleutnant and commander of Kradschützen-Bataillon 15

References

Citations

Bibliography

 

1897 births
1972 deaths
People from Bad Dürkheim (district)
Major generals of the German Army (Wehrmacht)
German Army personnel of World War I
Recipients of the clasp to the Iron Cross, 1st class
Recipients of the Knight's Cross of the Iron Cross
German prisoners of war in World War II
People from the Palatinate (region)
Military personnel from Bavaria
German Army generals of World War II